Attorney General Wade may refer to:

Charles Wade (1863–1922), Attorney General of New South Wales
Jan Wade (born 1937), Attorney-General of Victoria

See also
General Wade (disambiguation)